The Working Man's Friend and Family Instructor (short title used The Working Man's Friend)  was a mid-nineteenth century publication that was published by John Cassell in London.

It was produced in the months preceding the Great Exhibition and contained repeated references to the preparations and contributions.

Supplementary monthly editions were also published.

It had ceased publication by 1852.

Microforms and online forms of the publication have been made.

Notes

References

Publications established in 1850
Publications disestablished in 1852
1850s in London
Defunct magazines published in the United Kingdom
Cassell (publisher) books